Nygellidae is a family of nematodes belonging to the order Dorylaimida.

Genera:
 Nygellus Thorne, 1939

References

Nematodes
Nematode families